Belle Air Europe was a privately owned low-cost airline, founded in 2009 as a subsidiary by Belle Air, having its head office in Ancona, Italy. On 26 November 2013 Belle Air Europe ceased operations due to financial difficulties, just two days after the parent company Belle Air suspended operations as well.

Destinations

Belle Air Europe operated international flights on scheduled service to several cities in Belgium, Germany, Italy, Sweden, Switzerland out of Pristina International Airport Adem Jashari and to a smaller extent out of Skopje "Alexander the Great" Airport.

Fleet

As of November 2013, the Belle Air Europe fleet consisted of the following aircraft with an average age of 6.4 years:

References

External links

Official website

Defunct airlines of Italy
Defunct European low-cost airlines
Airlines established in 2009
Airlines disestablished in 2013
Italian companies established in 2009
Italian companies disestablished in 2013